The Tour of Belgium is a five-day bicycle race which is held annually in Belgium, and is part of the UCI ProSeries.

It was held annually between 1908 and 1981, except during both world wars. Between 1982 and 1990 several races were not organised and none at all from 1991 to 2001. From 2002 onwards the race has again become an annual fixture on the cycling calendar.

Following the start of the UCI ProTour in 2005 it looked like the race would merge with the Eneco Tour; however this did not happen and it became part of the UCI Europe Tour competition.

Winners
Twelve riders have managed to win the Tour of Belgium more than once. The most successful rider is German rider Tony Martin, who won three consecutive editions between 2012 and 2014.

By year

Multiple winners

By nation

Classifications
As of the 2021 edition, the jerseys worn by the leaders of the individual classifications are:
  Blue Jersey – Worn by the leader of the general classification.
  Red Jersey – Worn by the leader of the points classification.
  White Jersey – Worn by the leader of the combativity classification.

References

External links
Official Tour of Belgium website
Tour of Belgium full results 2008

 
UCI Europe Tour races
Recurring sporting events established in 1908
1908 establishments in Belgium
Cycle races in Belgium
Annual sporting events in Belgium
Spring (season) events in Belgium